My Grandmother Asked Me to Tell You She's Sorry (published in the United Kingdom as My Grandmother Sends her Regards and Apologises) is a novel written by the Swedish columnist, blogger, and writer Fredrik Backman. The book was first published in Swedish (as Min mormor hälsar och säger förlåt) in 2013. The English translation was later published in 2015. The rights for translation have been sold in more than 40 countries. In 2017, the novel was longlisted for the International Dublin Literary Award.

Plot summary
The story takes place in Sweden and follows Elsa, a 7-year-old who knows she is different from other children her age. Elsa has a habit of correcting others' grammar, is smart for her age, and is especially close with her grandmother (Granny). When Granny dies, Elsa slowly discovers more about her grandmother's past identities, as well as the lives of people affected by her grandmother.

The UK edition was published by Sceptre, an imprint of Hodder & Stoughton, in 2015, with the title My Grandmother Sends Her Regards and Apologises.

Film and TV adaptations
The northern European based Nordisk Film acquired the rights for the book for development in May 2018.

Audiobook 
An audio version of this book was released in 2015 by Simon & Schuster, Inc. It was read by Joan Walker.

References

External links
 http://books.simonandschuster.com/My-Grandmother-Asked-Me-to-Tell-You-Shes-Sorry/Fredrik-Backman/9781501115066

2013 Swedish novels
Novels set in Sweden
Swedish-language novels
Novels by Fredrik Backman
Bokförlaget Forum books
Washington Square Press books